Tire or tyre is the ring-shaped rubber covering that is fitted around the rim of a vehicle's wheel and is filled with air.

Tire may also refer to:

 A railway tire
 Tiredness or fatigue
 Tire, İzmir, a district in Turkey, and the center town of the district

See also
 
 
 Tyre (disambiguation)
 Tired (disambiguation)